Handball competitions at the 2008 Summer Olympics were held from 9 to 24 August at the Olympic Sports Centre Gymnasium and National Indoor Stadium. Medals were awarded for both men's and women's team events.  A National Olympic Committee was permitted to enter one men's team and one women's team in the handball competitions.

Medal summary

Participating teams

Men

Women

References 

Beijing 2008 Olympic Games
International Handball Federation
European Handball Federation
Team Handball News 2008 Men's Olympic Qualification Summary
Team Handball News 2008 Women's Olympic Qualification Summary

External links
Handball – Official Results Book

 
Handball competitions in China
2008 in handball
2008